Vice-Admiral Ahmad Zamir (30 April 1930 – 9 September 1985),  was a three-star rank admiral in the Pakistan Navy. Prior to his death in 1985, he was serving as the managing director of Karachi Shipyard and Engineering from 1983 until 1985.

Biography

Ahmad Zamir's original name was given as Zamir Ahmad but changed to Ahmad Zamir to ease to pronunciation. His family was an ultraconservative who followed the strict teaching of the Islam, and was initially homeschooled by their father.  His younger brother, Dr. Khurshid Ahmad is a well known economist and a political figure in the country. Despite his family's strict religious adherence, Zamir, in the Navy, was nonetheless described as moderate person.

After his matriculation in 1947, he was admitted and enrolled at a technical college in Delhi to study electrical engineering but made a transfer to Forman Christian College in Lahore where he did his pre-engineering courses after his family emigrated to Pakistan after the partition of India on 14 August 1947. The family later moved to Karachi where Ahmad was admitted to attend the NED University of Engineering and Technology to become an electrical engineer.  However, Ahmad left his studies in his final years to complete his B.E. program after seeing the navy advertisement and joined the Pakistan Navy in 1950.

He was sent to the United Kingdom, where he attended the Britannia Naval College and graduated in electronics in 1954, upon returning, he was promoted as Sub-Lieutenant in the Navy. His career in the Navy progressed well, and participated in the second war with India in 1965 as Lieutenant-Commander, and was later trained at the Pakistan Military Academy in 1966–68. In 1969, Cdr Zamir was posted in East-Pakistan where he was instrumental in setting up the Pakistan Marines's battalions with the elements of the Baloch Regiment. In 1970, Captain Zamir was made commanding officer of the Pakistan Marines. On 25 March 1971, Capt. Zamir deployed battalion of Pakistan Marines, together with the SSG Navy, in Chittagong. Additionally, there three more battalions were deployed with gunboats in Cox sector.

In 1974, Captain Zamir was repatriated to Pakistan from Zero Point Zero Point under the agreement signed with India. He continued his military service with the Navy, and was appointed as Director-General of Naval Intelligence with the rank of Commodore in 1975–77. In 1977, Cdre Zamir was appointed as DCNS of Operations (DCNS(Ops)), and later elevated as Chief of Staff under naval chief, Admiral Karamat Rahman Niazi, in 1979.

In 1979–81, Rear-Admiral Zamir was appointed as a Commander Pakistan Fleet (COMPAK). In 1981, he was promoted to three-star rank and was posted in Ministry of Defence Production. Vice-Admiral Ahmad served as the Secretary of Defence Production from 1981 until 1982 when he was appointed managing director of Karachi Shipyard and Engineering which he remained until his death in 1985.

Vice-Admiral Ahmad was initially in the race of being appointed to the four-star appointment and was promoted to four-star rank Admiral in Navy. Before the news was announced, Vice-Admiral Ahmad died of a heart attack, and Vice-Admiral Iftikhar Ahmed Sirohey was elevated as chief of naval staff.

See also
 Pakistani prisoners of war in India
 Pakistan Navy in East Pakistan
Pakistan Marines East
 Bangladesh Liberation War

References

Z
Z
Z
Z
Z
Z
Z
Z
Z
Z
Z
Z
Z
Z
Z
Z
Z